Elena Donaldson-Akhmilovskaya (born Elena Bronislavovna Akhmilovskaya, ; 11 March 1957 – 18 November 2012) was a Soviet-born American chess player. She was awarded the title of Woman Grandmaster by FIDE in 1977. She won the Women Candidates' tournament in 1986 and later in the same year played a match against Maia Chiburdanidze in Sofia for the Women's World Championship title, but lost by 8½–5½.

Donaldson-Akhmilovskaya was born in Leningrad in a family where all members played chess. In 1969 the family moved to Krasnoyarsk, where she started playing chess in the local Pioneers Palace chess circle. She lived in Sochi, then in Tbilisi, Georgia from 1979 until 1988, when she abruptly eloped to the United States by marrying U.S. team captain John Donaldson at the Chess Olympiad in Thessaloniki, Greece.

She lived in the Seattle area with her new husband, Georgi Orlov (himself an International Master), and their son after 1990. Her daughter from a previous marriage also lived in Seattle. She won the U.S. Women's Chess Championship in 1990 and 1994 and tied for the championship in 1993.

In 2010, she was awarded the title of FIDE Instructor. She died of brain cancer in 2012 in Kirkland, Washington.

References

External links 

 
 
 
 
 

1957 births
2012 deaths
American female chess players
American people of Russian descent
Chess woman grandmasters
Chess Olympiad competitors
Sportspeople from Saint Petersburg
Sportspeople from Seattle
Soviet female chess players
Soviet emigrants to the United States
Deaths from brain cancer in the United States
21st-century American women